Roosevelt Road (originally named 12th Street) is a major east-west street in the city of Chicago, Illinois, and its western suburbs. It runs under this name from Columbus Drive to the western city limits, then continues through the western suburbs including Lombard, Wheaton and, West Chicago until it reaches Geneva, where it is known as State Street. 12th Street was renamed to Roosevelt Road on May 25, 1919, in recognition of President Theodore Roosevelt, who had died the previous January. In 1928 the new U.S. Route 330 (US 330), a different alignment of US 30, went down Roosevelt Road to Geneva, in 1942 it was redesignated as US 30 Alternate. In 1972, after the route had been discontinued, Roosevelt Road outside Chicago became Illinois Route 38.

Route

In Grant Park (for which it serves as the southern boundary west of Lake Shore Drive), it is named Roosevelt Drive. The road begins at Lake Shore Drive and heads west, forming the southern boundary of the Chicago Loop. The area between Clark Street (100 W) and Jefferson Street (600 W) is a fast-growing commercial district, mostly home to large chain stores, including Best Buy, The Home Depot, Staples, Whole Foods Market and Target. This area used to be and remains to a lesser extent, a major fabric retail area. The famous Maxwell Street Market can be found just south of Roosevelt at Canal Street (500 W). Continuing west, it passes the University of Illinois at Chicago's two campuses and St. Ignatius College Preparatory School between Halsted Street and Damen Avenue. It also passes Douglass Park at California Avenue. Once past Mannheim Road it becomes Illinois Route 38.

Transit
Roosevelt Road is served by the 12 Roosevelt bus route. This was an electric trolley bus line from May 1953 until January 1973. The Chicago 'L' Roosevelt station is a stop and transfer point on the Red, Green and Orange lines. The former Roosevelt Road station on the Metra Electric Line has been replaced with the Museum Campus/11th Street station.

Major intersections

See also

Notes

References

Streets in Chicago
U.S. Route 30